Fleming Fjord is a fjord in King Christian X Land, eastern Greenland.

Administratively it lies in the Sermersooq Municipality.

History
This fjord was named "Fleming Inlet" by British explorer William Scoresby (1789 – 1857) after Scottish scholar John Fleming (1785–1857). Scoresby assumed that this fjord connected with "Hall Inlet" (Hall Bredning) to the south. 

After more than a century, this fjord was finally properly explored and mapped by Danish Arctic explorer Georg Carl Amdrup during the Three-year Expedition to East Greenland (Treårsekspeditionen) (1931–1934). Although Amdrup's survey proved that it was a fjord, the name "Fleming Inlet" continued to be used on maps for many years. 

A small wintering station was built in 1934 on the east side of Fleming Fjord near Cape Brown at the mouth of the Vimmelskaftet Valley during the time of the Three-year Expedition to East Greenland.

A Norwegian hunting hut was built in 1954 on the north side of the fjord  SW of Kap Biot, at the time of Hermann Andresen’s expedition. Another one was built nearby in 1955 by Otto Lapstun, who had moved it from nearby Nathorst Fjord.

Geography
The NW side of its mouth lies at the limit of Sermersooq Municipality, the Northeast Greenland National Park lying beyond Cape Biot. To the east lies the Wegener  Peninsula and Cape Brown, beyond which lies Nathorst Fjord. 

On most stretches of the shore mountains rise very steeply on both sides of the fjord culminating in sharp peaks. Most years the fjord is blocked with ice even in the summer.

See also
Fleming Fjord Formation
List of fjords of Greenland

Bibliography
Jens N. Lallensack, Hendrik Klein, Jesper Milàn, Oliver Wings, Octávio Mateus, and Lars B. Clemmensen. Sauropodomorph dinosaur trackways from the Fleming Fjord Formation of East Greenland: Evidence for Late Triassic sauropods, Acta Palaeontologica Polonica 62 (4), 2017: 833-843

References

External links
Simplified geologic map of Central Fjord region of East Greenland
The vertebrate-bearing Late Triassic Fleming Fjord Formation of central East Greenland revisited: Stratigraphy, palaeoclimate and new palaeontological data.
The Late Triassic Tetrapod Fauna of the Fleming Fjord Formation, East Greenland

Fjords of Greenland

ceb:Fleming Fjord
nl:Flemingfjord
sv:Fleming Fjord